Karambunai is a state constituency in Sabah, Malaysia that has been represented in the Sabah State Legislative Assembly since 2004.

The state constituency was created in the 2003 redistribution and is mandated to return a single member to the Sabah State Legislative Assembly under the first past the post voting system.

History 
2004–2016: The constituency contains the polling districts of Karambunai, Gudon, Inanam Laut, Likas Baru, Likas Darat, Kampong Likas, Taman Indah Permai, Bangka-Bangka, Kurol Melangi, Darau and Warisan.

2016–present: The constituency contains the polling districts of Karambunai, Gudon, Inanam Laut, Likas Baru, Likas Darat, Kampong Likas, Taman Indah Permai, Bangka-Bangka, Kurol Melangi, Darau, Warisan, Rampayan and Kibagu.

Representation history

Election results

References 

Sabah state constituencies